A Wrinkle in Time is a 2018 American science fantasy adventure film directed by Ava DuVernay and written by Jennifer Lee and Jeff Stockwell, based on Madeleine L'Engle's 1962 novel of the same name. Produced by Walt Disney Pictures and Whitaker Entertainment, the story follows a young girl who, with the help of three astral travelers, sets off on a quest to find her missing father. The film stars Oprah Winfrey, Reese Witherspoon, Mindy Kaling, Levi Miller, Storm Reid, Gugu Mbatha-Raw, Michael Peña, Zach Galifianakis, and Chris Pine.

It is Disney's second film adaptation of L'Engle's novel, following a 2003 television film. Development began in 2010, with DuVernay signing on to direct in February 2016. Principal photography began on November 2, 2016 in Los Angeles, California. Near the end of filming, production moved to New Zealand, where photography ended on February 25, 2017. With an estimated production budget of $103 million, the film became the first $100-million-budget live-action film to be directed by an African-American woman.

With a total production and marketing budget of at least $150 million, the film was one of the biggest box-office bombs of all time, with losses of up to $130.6 million. The film received generally negative reviews from critics, who criticized DuVernay's direction, the screenplay, and the pacing. However, some praised the performance of Reid.

Plot

Thirteen-year-old Meg Murry struggles to adjust at school due to bullying and depression, four years after the disappearance of her father Alex, a renowned astrophysicist. Meg and her gifted younger brother Charles Wallace are sent to the principal after Charles scolds a pair of gossiping teachers, and Meg retaliates against Veronica, Meg's neighbor and longtime bully. Meg and her mother Kate discover Charles with an unusual visitor, Mrs. Whatsit, who claims that the tesseract – a method of space travel Alex was studying – is real.

Meg and Charles meet her classmate Calvin O'Keefe, who joins them at the house of Mrs. Who, another strange friend of Charles who speaks only in quotations. Calvin has dinner with the Murrys, and Kate remembers Alex's commitment to their research despite public ridicule. In the backyard, Mrs. Whatsit and Mrs. Who appear with Mrs. Which, revealing themselves as astral travelers. Explaining that they have come to help find Alex, who has transported himself across the universe, the Misses lead Meg, Calvin, and Charles through a tesseract to the distant planet Uriel.

The planet's sentient flowers confirm that Alex visited Uriel, and Mrs. Whatsit transforms into a flying creature, carrying the children into the sky. Calvin nearly falls to his death after noticing a dark planet that Mrs. Which identifies as Camazotz, home to an evil energy known as "the IT". They tesser to the planet Orion to seek the help of a seer named Happy Medium. Mrs. Which reveals that the IT spreads negativity throughout the universe, including on Earth: Charles' gossiping teachers were jealous of the principal's promotion; Veronica judges herself for her weight; the Murrys' kindly neighbor is mugged by severely insecure teens; and Calvin's father is an abusive perfectionist.

Happy Medium helps Meg overcome her self-doubt, and they learn that her father tessered to Uriel, then Ixchel, but was trapped on Camazotz. The Misses insist they regroup on Earth, but Meg's determination to save her father overrides the tesseract, unintentionally redirecting them to Camazotz. Unable to stay, as Camazotz's evil is stronger than their light, the Misses bestow gifts before departing: Mrs. Who gives Meg her glasses to see what is really there, Mrs. Whatsit gives Meg the knowledge of her faults, and Mrs. Which gives the children the command to never separate.

A forest appears, separating Meg and Calvin from Charles, and they are pursued by a tornado-like storm. Meg uses the storm's own force to slingshot her and Calvin atop a cliff wall, where they reunite with Charles. They find themselves in a neighborhood of look-alike homes, children, and mothers; one woman invites them inside but Meg declines, reminding Calvin and Charles not to trust anyone. Their surroundings transform into a crowded beach, where a man introduces himself as Red, assuring them Alex is safe, and offers them food. When Charles says it tastes like sand, Red possesses him through the IT, which Red is actually a puppet of.

Meg and Calvin chase after Red and Charles through the crowd, but are trapped in a seemingly empty, spherical room. Red deactivates while Charles taunts Meg and Calvin. Using Mrs. Who's glasses, Meg finds an invisible staircase to another room where her father is imprisoned. After a tearful reunion, they are dragged by Charles to meet his master. As Calvin and Meg fall under the IT's power, Alex opens a tesseract to escape with the two of them. Refusing to abandon Charles, Meg projects back to Camazotz and confronts the IT in its malevolent, neuron-like form.

Charles and the IT try to force Meg to give in to darkness, menacing her with an idealized version of herself, but Meg embraces her own imperfections and uses her love for her brother to free him. The IT dissipates as the Misses reappear, congratulating Meg and Charles on becoming "warriors of light", and Meg tessers them home. Alex is reunited with his family, and Calvin leaves to confront his father, as Meg looks to the sky, thanking the Misses.

Cast 
 Oprah Winfrey as Mrs. Which, an astral being as old as the universe
 Reese Witherspoon as Mrs. Whatsit, an astral being whose favorite planet is the planet Uriel
 Mindy Kaling as Mrs. Who, an astral being from the planet Ixchel
 Storm Reid as Meg Murry, a gifted young girl who's been bullied by Veronica for the past years
 Lyric Wilson as young Meg
 Levi Miller as Calvin O'Keefe, Meg's classmate and friend
 Deric McCabe as Charles Wallace Murry, Meg's smart adoptive six-year-old brother who gets hypnotized by the IT
 Chris Pine as Dr. Alexander Murry, Meg and Charles Wallace's long-lost father and Kate's husband
 Gugu Mbatha-Raw as Dr. Kate Murry, Meg and Charles Wallace's mother and Alex's wife
 Zach Galifianakis as Happy Medium, a seer from the planet Orion
 Michael Peña as Red, a form of The IT
David Oyelowo as The IT, Red's true diabolical form
 André Holland as James Jenkins, the principal of Meg, Calvin and Charles Wallace's school
 Rowan Blanchard as Veronica Kiley, a student who bullies Meg because of her vanished father but later regrets her past actions and no longer bullies her
 Bellamy Young as Camazotz Woman, a mother from the Camazotz neighborhood 
 Conrad Roberts as Elegant Man, an elder neighbour and friend of Charles Wallace
 Will McCormack and Yvette Cason as Two unnamed teachers, two gossipy teachers that are jealous of kids with gifts
 Daniel MacPherson as Mr. O'Keefe, Calvin's abusive and unloving father

Production

Development
In October 2010, Walt Disney Pictures retained the film rights for the 1962 novel A Wrinkle in Time, by Madeleine L'Engle, which had previously been made as a 2003 television film. Following the financial success of Tim Burton's Alice in Wonderland (2010), Disney hired Jeff Stockwell to write the screenplay for Cary Granat and his new Bedrock Studios. Granat had previously worked with Disney on the Chronicles of Narnia and Bridge to Terabithia films. The project's budget was slated to be $35 million, which the company compared to District 9 and Bridge to Terabithia, both of which were made for less than $30 million.

However, A Wrinkle in Time was part of a new California Film Commission tax credit program, which offset production costs considerably. On August 5, 2014, Jennifer Lee was announced as the screenwriter, taking over from Stockwell, who wrote the first draft.

On February 8, 2016, it was reported that Ava DuVernay had been offered the job of directing the film, and she was confirmed to direct later that same month. She became the first African-American woman to direct a live-action film with a production budget of more than $100 million. The decision received positive sentiments in the media industry. Oprah Winfrey was happy to see this because DuVernay herself broke barriers for nonwhite people in the film industry. "So I do imagine, to be a brown-skinned girl of any race throughout the world, looking up on that screen and seeing Storm, I think that is a capital A, capital W, E, some, AWESOME, experience."

Irene Monroe of The Cambridge Day expressed her feelings that Ava DuVernay was a superb choice of a director, due to the fact that she was able to highlight and expose the struggles experienced by young African-American girls.

Casting
On July 26, 2016, Variety reported that Oprah Winfrey began final negotiations to join the film to play Mrs. Which, the eldest of the three Mrs. Ws, celestial beings who guide the children along their journey. In September, 2016, Reese Witherspoon and Mindy Kaling were reported to be in talks to join the film, with Witherspoon to play Mrs. Whatsit, a chatty, grandmotherly sprite, and Kaling to play the quotation-reciting Mrs. Who. On September 13, 2016, Storm Reid was cast in the lead role of Meg Murry, a young girl traumatized by the disappearance of her scientist father years before.

In October 2016, Gugu Mbatha-Raw and Chris Pine were cast as Meg's parents, Drs. Kate and Alex Murry. On November 1, 2016, additional cast announcements included Zach Galifianakis as Happy Medium, André Holland as Principal Jenkins, Levi Miller as Calvin, and Deric McCabe as Charles Wallace, along with Bellamy Young, Rowan Blanchard and Will McCormack. Later, Michael Peña joined the cast to play Red. The film producers are James Whitaker and Catherine Hand.

Filming 
Principal photography on the film began November 2, 2016, in Los Angeles, California. Tobias A. Schliessler was the film's cinematographer, Naomi Shohan was production designer, Paco Delgado was costume designer, and Rich McBride was the film's visual effects supervisor. During production, DuVernay asked McBride to be as flexible as possible on visual effects sequences to enable her to make changes and incorporate new ideas during shooting.

Filming for A Wrinkle in Time took place in multiple locations including Eureka, California, in Humboldt County, starting November 29, 2016.

After Los Angeles, production moved to New Zealand for two weeks. During the last two weeks of February 2017, filming locations for A Wrinkle in Time were in Central Otago, New Zealand. Actors and crew were in New Zealand for two weeks to shoot scenes in the Southern Alps, including at Hunter Valley Station near Lake Hāwea, with cast and crew treated to a traditional Māori powhiri and karakia. Filming wrapped up in New Zealand's South Island after two weeks, and DuVernay declared the cast and crew's love for New Zealand in an Instagram post.

Music

On September 28, 2017, Ramin Djawadi was announced as the composer for the film, replacing Jonny Greenwood, who was initially chosen to compose and score the film. On February 20, 2018, it was announced that the soundtrack would feature appearances from Sade, Sia, Kehlani, Chloe x Halle, Freestyle Fellowship, DJ Khaled, and Demi Lovato.

Release
A Wrinkle in Time premiered at the El Capitan Theatre on February 26, 2018, with its theatrical release on March 9, 2018. This was a month ahead of its initial release date of April 6, 2018. The film was released by Walt Disney Studios Home Entertainment on 4K UHD Blu-ray, Blu-ray, and DVD on June 5, 2018. It became available for streaming on Disney+ in the United States on March 25, 2020 after being available since launch elsewhere.

Reception

Box office
A Wrinkle in Time grossed $100.5 million in the U.S. and Canada, and $32.2 million in other territories, for a worldwide total of $132.7 million. A combined $250 million was spent on production and advertisement. Following Disney's Q2 earnings report in May 2018, Yahoo! Finance deduced the film would lose the studio $86–186 million, and in April 2019, Deadline Hollywood calculated the film lost $130.6 million, when factoring together all expenses and revenues.

In the U.S. and Canada, A Wrinkle in Time was released alongside The Hurricane Heist, Gringo, and The Strangers: Prey at Night, and was projected to gross $30–38 million from 3,980 theaters in its opening weekend. It made $10.2 million on its first day, including $1.3 million from Thursday night previews. It went on to debut at $33.3 million, finishing second behind Disney's own Black Panther ($41.1 million in its fourth weekend). In its second weekend, the film made $16.6 million, dropping 50% to fourth place. On June 15, in its 15th week of release, the film returned to a total of 285 theaters, often as part of a double-feature with Incredibles 2. It ended up making $1.7 million (a 1,600% increase from the previous weekend), pushing the total U.S. gross to $100 million.

Internationally, the film opened in six countries alongside the U.S. and grossed $6.3 million in its opening weekend, Russia being the largest market with $4.1 million.

Critical response

The website's critical consensus reads, "A Wrinkle in Time is visually gorgeous, big-hearted, and occasionally quite moving; unfortunately, it's also wildly ambitious to a fault, and often less than the sum of its classic parts." On Metacritic, the film has a weighted average score of 53 out of 100, based on 52 critics, indicating "mixed or average reviews". Audiences polled by CinemaScore gave the film an average grade of "B" on an A+ to F scale, while PostTrak reported filmgoers gave it a 75% overall positive score; audience members under age 18 gave it an average grade of "A−" and a positive score of 89%.

Alonso Duralde of TheWrap praised the film's visuals and performances, writing, "Awash in bold colors, bright patterns and ebullient kids, director Ava DuVernay's new take on 'A Wrinkle in Time' dazzles its way across time and space even if it doesn't quite stick the landing." David Ehrlich of IndieWire gave the film a "C+" and praised what he described as its ambition, saying: "It almost doesn't matter that the movie is too emotionally prescriptive to have any real power, or too high on imagination to leave any room for wonder; DuVernay evinces such faith in who she is and what she's doing that 'A Wrinkle in Time' remains true to itself even when everything on screen reads false." Jamie Broadnax, a freelance writer and member of the Critic's Choice Awards, tweeted that after seeing the film for the second time, she still was unable to conceptualize and take in the visuals displayed throughout the film and the numerous performances from various characters. Kat Candler, an American independent filmmaker, stated that the film was a "gorgeous love letter to the warriors of the next generation". Mercedes Howze of the New Pittsburgh Courier stated that the visuals were extraordinary and that the film "continues to make lasting impressions on innocent minds to change what it looks like to be a young black woman".

Vince Mancini of Uproxx gave the film a negative review, saying, "...if anything, the trouble with 'Wrinkle' is that you never really get a sense of DuVernay's personal touch. In fact, it feels a lot like Brad Bird's big-budget, equally smarmy 2015 Disney film Tomorrowland. Both attempt to be so broad and universal that they feel disconnected from anything human. But universality doesn't work that way, no matter how much you tell everyone to think like a kid." Conner Schwerdtfeger, former entertainment journalist for CinemaBlend, stated that the movie was "all over the place and underperformed," but that DuVernay deserves some praise for the attempt at filming the seemingly unfilmable. Sean Mulvihill in "Living Luminaries: On the Serious Business of Happiness," stated that the film had no flow, and although some moments "come alive" in the film, it could not save it. Todd McCarthy of The Hollywood Reporter felt that the film was "unable to charm or disarm" the audience. Wenlei Ma, film and TV critic of news.com.au, stated that, following the halfway mark in the film, movie-goers find themselves "not caring about the other characters besides Meg" and that it seemed to "drag" in the latter half. She called the film a disappointment, regardless of the value parents find in the messages for children via quotations from Mahatma Gandhi and Nelson Mandela.

Accolades

See also
 Afrofuturism in film
 Black film
 List of black films of the 2010s

References

External links

  
 
 
 A Wrinkle in Time at Box Office Mojo

2018 films
2010s fantasy adventure films
2010s science fiction films
American children's adventure films
American fantasy adventure films
American science fantasy films
American science fiction adventure films
American space adventure films
Films about siblings
Films based on American novels
Films based on children's books
Films based on fantasy novels
Films based on science fiction novels
Films scored by Ramin Djawadi
Films directed by Ava DuVernay
Films set in Los Angeles
Films shot in Los Angeles
Films shot in New Zealand
Films set on fictional planets
Films with screenplays by Jennifer Lee (filmmaker)
Films using motion capture
Films about time travel
Time Quintet
Walt Disney Pictures films
Films about time
Magic realism films
Metaphysical fiction films
2010s English-language films
2010s American films